Burlingame is a city in San Mateo County, California. It is located on the San Francisco Peninsula and has a significant shoreline on San Francisco Bay. The city is named after diplomat Anson Burlingame and is known for its numerous eucalyptus groves, high quality of life, walkable downtown area, and public school system. As of the 2020 census, the city population was 31,386.

History

Burlingame is situated on land previously owned by San Francisco-based merchant William Davis Merry Howard. Howard planted many eucalyptus trees on his property and retired to live on the land. Howard died in 1856 and the land was sold to William C. Ralston, a prominent banker. In 1868, Ralston named the land after his friend Anson Burlingame, the United States Ambassador to China. After the 1906 San Francisco earthquake, hundreds of lots in Burlingame were sold to people looking to establish new homes, and the town of Burlingame was incorporated in 1908. In 1910, the neighboring town of Easton was annexed and this area is now known as the Easton Addition neighborhood of Burlingame.

Burlingame refers to itself as the City of Trees due to its over 18,000 public trees within the city. In 1908, the Burlingame board of trustees passed an ordinance "prohibiting cutting, injuring, or destroying trees". The city also has many parks and eucalyptus groves.

In 2018, upon the 150th anniversary of the 1868 landmark Burlingame Treaty between the U.S. and China, a new bust of diplomat Anson Burlingame, sculpted by Zhou Limin from China, was unveiled at an international ceremony at the Burlingame Public Library.

Geography

Several creeks drain across Burlingame from the peninsula hills to the San Francisco Bay.

Climate
Burlingame experiences warm and dry summers, with no average monthly temperatures above . According to the Köppen Climate Classification system, Burlingame has a warm-summer Mediterranean climate.

Demographics

 reported that Burlingame had a population of 28,806. Details regarding the demographic profile are shown below.

The population was spread out, with 6,256 people (21.7%) under the age of 18, 1,496 people (5.2%) aged 18 to 24, 8,872 people (30.8%) aged 25 to 44, 8,136 people (28.2%) aged 45 to 64, and 4,046 people (14.0%) who were 65 years of age or older. The median age was 40.5 years. For every 100 females, there were 90.4 males. For every 100 females age 18 and over, there were 88.2 males.

There were 12,361 households with average household size of 2.29. There were 7,183 families (58.1% of all households); the average family size was 3.02.

According to the U.S. Census Bureau, American Community Survey (ACS), median household income was $122,999 and per capita income was $70,519, in 2018 dollars.

Neighborhoods

 Burlingame Estates
 Burlingame Gardens 
 Burlingame Gate
 Burlingame Hills
 Burlingame Park
 Burlingame Terrace
 Burlingame Village
 Country Club Manor
 Downtown
 Easton Addition
 Lyon Hoag
 Oak Grove Manor
 Ray Park

Government

According to the California Secretary of State, as of February 10, 2019, Burlingame has 17,750 registered voters. Of those, 8,439 (47.5%) are registered Democrats, 3,048 (17.2%) are registered Republicans, and 5,551 (31.3%) have declined to state a political party.

Economy
In the 1920s, Burlingame became a popular location for automobile retailers which became known as "Auto Row".

In the 1960s, various airline support service businesses opened in Burlingame due to its proximity to San Francisco International Airport. , LSG/Sky Chefs, Inc. and China Airlines are all located in Burlingame. The airport location has also attracted the headquarters of medium-sized multi-site companies such as Meri Meri and Proterra, Inc.

Historically, Burlingame has been home to many candy and chocolate companies, including  the It's-It ice cream factory and store, Guittard Chocolate, the See's Candies lollipop factory, and family-owned candy stores, including Powell's, Preston's, Aida Opera Candies, and Nuts for Candy.

Since 2010, Burlingame's economy has diversified substantially and it has become an attractive location for biotechnology companies given its proximity to South San Francisco. Biotechnology companies with offices in Burlingame include Annai Systems, Breathometer, Cala Health, Cleave Biosciences, Collaborative Drug Discovery, Confidence Clinical Research, Corvus Pharmaceuticals, Igenica Biotherapeutics, Kindred Biosciences, Omnitura, Phoenix Pharmaceuticals, Pulse Biosciences, Respira Therapeutics, and Vector Labs.

Additionally, multiple high-technology firms have established offices in Burlingame due to its location between the booming technology centers of Silicon Valley to the south and San Francisco to the north. Tech companies with Burlingame offices include: Zecco.com, Natsume, Color Genomics, CarWoo, Jobvite, DataStax, Sprint's M2M Collaboration Center, YouWeb, OpenFeint, CrowdStar, BitGravity, Veebeam, and TellApart.

As of March 2022, the median single home value in Burlingame was $2.8 million.

Education

Primary and secondary schools
Public schools
San Mateo Union High School District operates local high schools while the Burlingame School District operates elementary and middle schools.

Burlingame High School is the city's sole public high school. Burlingame Intermediate School is Burlingame's sole public middle school. There are six public elementary schools serving Burlingame. They are Franklin Elementary, Lincoln Elementary, McKinley Elementary, Roosevelt Elementary, Washington Elementary, and Hoover Elementary. According to the 2009 Base Academic Performance Index (API) Scores from the California Department of Education, the Burlingame School District ranks among the best in the state, with 4 out of their 6 public elementary schools (Roosevelt Elementary, Washington Elementary, Franklin Elementary, and Lincoln Elementary) scoring well between 880 and 925, and with ratings of 9 or 10. Burlingame school district enrollment has continually been increasing as young families move to the city. The city has passed two bond measures to add new facilities and modernize existing facilities to provide state-of-the-art classrooms. The city recently extensively renovated and modernized the Hoover School, which was built in 1931 and reopened in 2016.

Private schools
Mercy High School is a  private Catholic all-girls high school in Burlingame. It was founded in 1931 by the Sisters of Mercy. The school is located in the Kohl Mansion which is a Historic Landmark.  Our Lady of Angels School and St. Catherine of Siena School are located in Burlingame.

Public libraries
Burlingame Library is located in Burlingame. It was established by city ordinance October 11, 1909. Following the Loma Prieta earthquake in 1989, the City approved a bond issue to reconstruct the library. The architecture has won awards and earned a cover story in the 1998 American Libraries journal. A second branch, located on Easton Drive, is substantially smaller than the main branch. Both are operated by the Peninsula Library System, the library authority for the county.

Points of interest

Burlingame Avenue and Broadway, two streets running parallel to each other about one mile apart, are two of the city's main retail districts and downtown areas. Downtown Burlingame Avenue also houses the Apple Store.
Burlingame Station, a Caltrain station in Burlingame, is listed on the National Register of Historic Places.
It was originally built by Bessie and Frederick Kohl, with architects Howard and White, and completed in 1914. The estate included tennis courts, greenhouses, a rose garden, a large carriage house, and a 150,000 gallon reservoir. In 1921, the silent version of the film Little Lord Fauntleroy, with Mary Pickford, was filmed in the Kohl Mansion. The mansion, sold to the Sisters of Mercy in 1924, was a convent from 1924 to 1931, and it has been the home of Mercy High School since 1931.
The Burlingame Museum of Pez Memorabilia was located off of Burlingame avenue and claimed to have every Pez dispenser ever sold. It was founded in 1995 by Gary and Nancy Doss who had been collecting Pez dispensers for more than a decade. The museum was featured in Time, on the Discovery Channel, and Travel Channel. It closed in July 2019

Transportation

Highways
Three highways pass through Burlingame. Highway 101 runs from San Jose to San Francisco along San Francisco Bay. Highway 82, also known as El Camino Real, runs parallel to Highway 101 and acts as the main corridor for local traffic going up and down the peninsula. A small section of Highway 35 (Skyline Boulevard) also lies with city limits.  It connects with Interstate 280, which runs along the side of Burlingame opposite Highway 101.

Public transport
Caltrain has served Burlingame station since 1985 when it bought out Southern Pacific. It uses the same depot that was used in the early 20th century.

Bay Area Rapid Transit has its southern terminus for the Yellow line and Red line in Millbrae, just north of Burlingame. BART's tracks are within Burlingame city limits.

In terms of buses, Burlingame is served by SamTrans bus lines 292, 398, 46 and the ECR as well as Commute.org and Caltrain shuttles. The City of Burlingame and local businesses sponsor the Burlingame Trolley, a two-route shuttle.

Air transport 
Burlingame is among the closest cities to San Francisco International Airport, and through BART and buses, is directly accessible to the airport's AirTrain system. Through BART, Burlingame is also connected to Oakland International Airport, and by using a combination of CalTrain services and VTA buses or light rail, Burlingame is connected to San Jose International Airport.

Notable people

Actors 

 Dianna Agron, actress from Glee, attended Burlingame Intermediate School and Burlingame High School
 Sally Dryer, actress known for voicing Lucy Van Pelt in Peanuts holiday specials
 Hannah Hart, comedian and YouTuber, was raised in Burlingame
Adam Klein, winner of Survivor: Millennials vs Gen X, attended Burlingame High School
Brad Schreiber, author and TV writer-producer, attended Burlingame High School and lived in the mayor's mansion at 238 Myrtle Road

Artists and designers 
Chen Chi-kwan, (1921–2007) Taiwanese-born artist, architect, and educator, lived and died in Burlingame.
Leon Gilmour, (1907–1996) wood engraving artist, died in Burlingame
Percy Gray, artist and painter, lived in Burlingame from 1912 to 1923
Fred Lyon (1924–2022) American photographer, raised in Burlingame.

Businesspeople and entrepreneurs 

 Marc Benioff, founder and CEO of Salesforce.com, attended Burlingame High School
 Charles S. Howard, owner of Seabiscuit, owned a home in Burlingame
Leonard Read, founder of the Foundation for Economic Education, lived in Burlingame

Writers 

 Bill Amend, author of the comic strip FoxTrot, attended Burlingame High School
Shirley Jackson, author, whose novel The Road Through the Wall is set in Burlingame
 Tamora Pierce, best-selling children's author, attended Burlingame Intermediate School

Sports 
Travis Bader, basketball player, attended Burlingame Intermediate School and Burlingame High School
David Bakhtiari, starting offensive tackle for the Green Bay Packers, lives in Burlingame
Scott Feldman, Major League Baseball pitcher for the Cincinnati Reds
George Kelly, Hall of Fame baseball player nicknamed "High Pockets", lived and died in Burlingame
Hank Sauer, two-time All-Star outfielder for Chicago Cubs, died in Burlingame

Others 
Jung-Ho Pak, orchestra conductor, was born in Burlingame
Tom Lantos, Democratic Congressman who resided in Burlingame during his time in office.
Katrina Swett, President of the Lantos Foundation. Former chair of the U.S. Commission on International Religious Freedom. 2002 and 2010 candidate for New Hampshire's 2nd congressional district. Daughter of Congressman Tom Lantos and wife of Congressman Richard Swett.

In popular culture
In The Maltese Falcon, Sam Spade rushes to 26 Ancho Street in Burlingame to rescue Brigid O'Shaughnessy.
Scenes from the film Dangerous Minds were filmed on the campus of Burlingame High School in the spring of 1994.
Burlingame is home to the historic Kohl Mansion, where the movie Flubber was filmed.
In James Patterson's Women's Murder Club series, San Francisco Assistant District Attorney Jill Bernhardt lives in Burlingame.
 Leo Wyatt, a character from the series Charmed, was born in Burlingame.
Sam Hill, the protagonist in Robert Dugoni's The Extraordinary Life of Sam Hell, is born and raised in Burlingame.

See also

References

External links
 

 
 Burlingame Public Library
 Burlingame School District
 Burlingame Historical Society
 Downtown Burlingame Directory

 
1908 establishments in California
Cities in San Mateo County, California
Cities in the San Francisco Bay Area
Incorporated cities and towns in California
Populated coastal places in California
Populated places established in 1908